Liaoning (16) is a Chinese Type 001 aircraft carrier. The first aircraft carrier commissioned into the People's Liberation Army Navy Surface Force, she was originally classified as a training ship, intended to allow the Navy to experiment, train and gain familiarity with aircraft carrier operations. Following upgrades and additional training in late 2018, Chinese state media announced that the ship would shift to a combat role in 2019.

Originally laid down in 1985 for the Soviet Navy as the  aircraft carrier Riga, she was launched on 4 December 1988 and renamed Varyag in 1990. After the dissolution of the Soviet Union in 1991, construction was halted and the ship was put up for sale by Ukraine. The stripped hulk was purchased in 1998 and towed to the Dalian naval shipyard in northeast China.

The ship was rebuilt and commissioned into the People's Liberation Army Navy (PLAN) as Liaoning on 25 September 2012. Its Chinese ship class designation is Type 001. In November 2016, the political commissar of Liaoning, Commodore Li Dongyou, stated that Liaoning was combat-ready.

Classification

The Kuznetsov-class ships were originally designated by the Soviet Navy as "" (tyazholiy avianesushchiy kreyser, TAKR or TAVKR), meaning "heavy aircraft-carrying cruiser". In addition to aircraft, the ships were designed to carry P-700 Granit anti-ship cruise missiles that also form the main armament of the s. This multirole capability allowed the ships to avoid classification as aircraft carriers, thus allowing them to pass through the Turkish Straits between the Black Sea and the Mediterranean Sea. Under the Montreux Convention, aircraft carriers larger than 15,000 tons are not permitted to pass through the Straits, but there is no displacement limit on other types of capital ships from Black Sea powers.

In contrast, the People's Liberation Army Navy considers Liaoning to be an aircraft carrier. Since China is not located on the Black Sea and thus not considered a Black Sea power under the Montreux Convention, it does not need and cannot use the tonnage exemption for non-aircraft carrier capital ships. The ship was completed as an aircraft carrier, and cruise missiles were never installed. Liaoning is equipped only with air defense weapons and must use its aircraft for a surface attack.

History

Origin

The ship was laid down as Riga at Shipyard 444 (now Mykolaiv South) in Mykolaiv, Ukrainian SSR, on 6 December 1985. Design work was undertaken by the Nevskoye Planning and Design Bureau. Launched on 4 December 1988, the carrier was renamed Varyag in late 1990, after a previous similarly named cruiser launched in 1899. When the Soviet Union collapsed in 1991, the ship was only 68% complete. Construction was halted, and the ship was put up for sale. The name Varyag was then adopted by another cruiser launched in 1983.

Sale
Ukraine approached China, India, and Russia as potential buyers. China sent a high-level delegation in 1992, which reported that the ship was in good condition and recommended a purchase. However, the Chinese government declined to purchase the ship because of the international diplomatic situation at the time. Unable to find a buyer, Ukraine left the ship to deteriorate in the elements.

In 1998, the rusting hulk was sold at auction for $20 million to Agencia Turistica E Diversoes Chong Lot Limitada, a company from Macau. Chong Lot proposed to tow Varyag to Macau under pretenses of conversion into a $200 million floating hotel and casino; Western observers were suspicious of the deal since Chong Lot had no listed telephone number, was not located at its listed address, and was run by former officers in the Chinese Navy. Officials in Macau also denied Chong Lot's application to operate a casino. However, analysts noted that Varyag had deteriorated too much to be used as an operational warship and pointed out that the Chinese Navy was concentrating on submarines. The Soviet carriers  and  had also been sold to China as tourist attractions.

In January 2015, further details emerged in an interview with Hong Kong-based businessman Xu Zengping by the South China Morning Post.  Xu, a former military basketball player, reported that he had been commissioned by the PLAN to purchase the vessel on its behalf, with the floating hotel and casino as a cover story.  He was warned that the Chinese Navy did not have the budget to buy the ship, and the Chinese government did not support the purchase.  However, Xu was so impressed when touring the ship that he resolved to purchase it using his personal funds. The previous year, Xu had borrowed HK$230 million from a Hong Kong business friend, spending HK$6 million to create Chong Lot as a Macau shell corporation.  He described a harrowing negotiation in Kyiv, lubricated by bribery and liquor, which helped to arrange victory at the auction. As a precaution, he shipped 40 tonnes of the carrier's blueprints to China overland in eight trucks.

Transfer to China

The passage from Ukraine to China was even more troublesome than the purchase. In June 2000, Varyag was taken under tow. As the tugboat approached the Bosphorus, Turkey denied permission for the ship to pass through, citing the risk that a gust of wind would turn the ship widthwise and block the entire strait. Varyag spent the next 16 months being towed around the Black Sea, accruing towing charges of $8,500 a day as Chong Lot stopped paying its bills. The tugboat operator compared its fate to the Yellow Fleet that was stuck in the Suez Canal for eight years, and French thrillseekers even landed a helicopter on the ship. Meanwhile, Chinese officials negotiated with Turkey, offering trade and tourism concessions.

In August 2001, Turkey relented and agreed to allow the ship to pass. On 1 November 2001, the Bosphorus was cleared of all other traffic as Varyag was towed through. On 2 November, Varyag also passed through the Dardanelles without incident. On 4 November, Varyag was caught in a force 10 gale and broke adrift while passing the Greek island of Skyros. The ship was taken back under tow on 6 November, after one sailor died while attempting to attach the tow lines.

The tugboat fleet called for supplies en route at Piraeus, Greece; Las Palmas, Canary Islands; Maputo, Mozambique; and Singapore. Varyag entered Chinese waters on 20 February 2002, and arrived on 3 March at the Dalian naval shipyard in northeast China. The costs included $25 million to the Ukrainian government for the hull, nearly $500,000 in transit fees, and $5 million for 20 months of towing fees.

Xu Zengping estimated in 2015 that his total out-of-pocket cost was at least US$120 million. He insisted that he had never been reimbursed by the Chinese government, and had spent the last 18 years repaying his debts, in part by selling properties such as his home. A source familiar with the acquisition explained that the naval official, Ji Shengde, who initiated the mission had been in prison because of smuggling.

Contrary to initial reports that the ship had no engines, Xu reported that all four original engines remained intact at the time of purchase, but had been shut down and preserved in grease seals. A refit restored them to working order in 2011.

Modernization and refurbishment
701st Institute was tasked to redesign Varyag with Zhu Yingfu (朱英富) and Wu Xiaoguang (吴晓光) were assigned respectively as the general designer and deputy general designer. Wang Zhiguo (王治国) was assigned as the general system engineer, and Yang Lei (杨雷) was assigned as the general supervisor. The workload of converting Varyag for operational use was equivalent to building ten new destroyers. Varyag was moved in June 2005 to a dry dock at Dalian. Her hull was sandblasted, scaffolding erected, and the ship's island was painted in a red marine primer to treat metal corrosion.

Observers have noted the installation of Type 348 active electronically scanned array (AESA) radar (four arrays) and Sea Eagle radar. The air defence system consists of the Type 1130 CIWS and the HQ-10 missile system. The anti-ship missile tubes would not be used, freeing up internal space for hangar or storage use. Russia has explored similar modifications to her sister ship .

On 8 June 2011, General Chen Bingde made the first public acknowledgement of the ship's refit. On 27 July 2011, the Chinese Defence Ministry announced it was refitting the vessel for "scientific research, experiment and training".

In 2018, Asia Times reported that Sun Bo, a general manager of China Shipbuilding Industry Corporation, had allegedly passed on technical details of Liaoning to the Central Intelligence Agency. Sun was a general manager at the Dalian shipyard where the ship's refurbishment was done.

Sea trials

The ship undertook her first sea trials from 10 August 2011 to 15 August 2011. On 29 November 2011 the carrier left port for her second set of trials. The carrier completed her eighth sea trial between 7 and 21 June 2012 and returned to Dalian. In July 2012, the ship set out for the longest trials thus far, 25 days. The carrier completed sea trials in early August 2012 and loaded Shenyang J-15 aircraft and KJ-88, YJ-83K and YJ-91 missiles in preparation for weapons systems trials.

During sea trials, Liaoning experienced a steam burst in the engine compartment which forced the crew to evacuate some parts of the ship, and the ship lost power. The problem was ultimately resolved and power was restored, although the time duration of the problem has not been released by military officials.

Handover to the Navy
On 23 September 2012, the aircraft carrier was handed over to the PLAN, and was commissioned on 25 September 2012. At the commissioning ceremony, the carrier was officially named Liaoning, in honour of the province in which she was retrofitted. On 26 December 2012, the People's Daily reported that it would take four to five years for Liaoning to reach full capacity. As it was a training ship until 2018, Liaoning was not assigned to any of China's operational fleets.

According to geopolitical analysts, China could use Liaoning and its future carriers to intimidate other countries that have territorial claims in the South China Sea, as well as extending air control further south of the disputed region. In December 2016 the ship exercised in the Western Pacific, including passing through the Miyako Strait between the Japanese islands of Miyako-jima and Okinawa. On 18 April 2018, Liaoning took part in the navy's live-fire exercises in the South China Sea, involving 76 fighter jets and 48 warships and submarines. The drills came after a large military display presided over by Chinese paramount leader Xi Jinping, and were condemned by Taiwan as "military intimidation".

Design

The Type 001 is built upon the unfinished hull of Kuznetsov-class aircraft carrier Varyag. Unlike Soviet Kuznetsov, the Chinese Type 001 ships are configured solely as aircraft carriers. The cruise missile launchers were never installed, and the launcher base was removed during the refit to incorporate a larger hangar bay. The air-defense system consists of FL-3000N surface-to-air-missiles and the Type 1130 CIWS.

In August 2014, the Chinese-language Shanghai Morning Post listed that CNS Liaoning would carry 36 aircraft: 24 Shenyang J-15 fighters, six Changhe Z-18F anti-submarine warfare (ASW) helicopters, four Changhe Z-18J airborne early warning helicopters and two Harbin Z-9C rescue helicopters. The Chinese carrier aircraft inventory is similar to a balanced combat and support aircraft approach intended for Soviet aircraft carriers, which supported nuclear submarines, large surface combatants, and land-based strike bombers performing anti-access roles. 

The Soviet lineage has its limitations. The air wing lacks long-range radar and anti-submarine fixed-wing aircraft, needing support from shore-based aircraft such as Tupolev Tu-154 ASW and Shaanxi Y-8 AWACS aircraft. The U.S. Department of Defense noted that J-15s will have below normal range and armament when operating from the carrier, due to limits imposed by the ski-jump takeoff system. The lack of a carrier onboard delivery aircraft like the United States Navy (USN) Grumman C-2 Greyhound also limits logistics capabilities. Liaoning would need extensive land-based support to oppose a USN carrier strike group; however, it would be potent against the Vietnam People's Navy and the Philippine Navy. Deficiencies will likely be corrected with future aircraft carriers, which are expected to be larger with conventional takeoff decks and catapult launching for heavier fighters, plus fixed-wing radar and anti-submarine patrol aircraft.

Operational history

Home port
Liaoning is visible on satellite imagery regularly berthed at a large jetty at the Yuchi Naval Base (near Huangdao) in China's Shandong province since 2013; this is reported as its home port.

Maintenance and refit
In August 2018, the South China Morning Post reported that Liaoning was berthed at Dalian undergoing its first refit since its commissioning in 2012. The radar above Liaonings bridge and the air traffic control at the rear of the island superstructure were noted to have been removed, and scaffolding was also noted around the command center. The refit was completed in January 2019, spending about six months. The ship superstructure was modified with an improved design, and the flight deck was completely stripped and refurbished.

Training and aircraft handling

On 4 November 2012, the People's Liberation Army's website reported that Shenyang J-15s had performed carrier touch-and-go training. On 25 November 2012, China announced that J-15s had made five successful arrested landings on Liaoning. In June 2013, a second round of flight tests began on board CNS Liaoning, with personnel from the fleet air arm of the Brazilian Navy providing carrier training support to the People's Liberation Army Navy Air Force who operate the J-15s.

In August 2014, based on an article from Chinese state media, Western news outlets reported that two pilots had been killed testing jets slated to operate from CNS Liaoning. Chinese military officials stated such reports were misleading, and clarified that deaths were in fact unrelated with tests on the carrier. The original Chinese article from Xinhua also did not link the deaths with the J-15 nor mention any loss of such aircraft.

In December 2021, Liaoning carrier group was deployed to Yellow Sea, East China Sea, and Western Pacific.

In May 2022, the Liaoning and its carrier strike group conducted drills in the East China Sea and they were sighted near Miyako Island by the JMSDF. Japanese analysts noted a very high operational tempo from the Liaoning, suggesting China's growing confidence and maturity in aircraft carrier operations.

See also
 Liu Zhe, captain of Liaoning
 , also originally built for the Soviet Navy and sold to India
 List of aircraft carriers
 List of aircraft carriers of Russia and the Soviet Union

References

External links

 varyagworld.com
 Transformation of the Varyag into a PLAN Aircraft Carrier
 "Varyag Aircraft Carrier" article on sinodefence.com
 physical location in the World
 Satellite Photo of Varyag in Dalian, China from Google Maps
 Chinese carrier operations
 "China's aircraft carrier anchors in military port" Slideshow, People's Daily Xinhua 10:14, 27 February 2013

Admiral Kuznetsov-class aircraft carriers
Ships built at the Black Sea Shipyard
1988 ships
History of Dalian
History of Macau
Abandoned military projects of the Soviet Union
Aircraft carriers of the People's Liberation Army Navy
Ships built in the Soviet Union